Guilford is a prominent and historic neighborhood located in the northern part of Baltimore, Maryland.  It is bounded on the south by University Parkway, on the west by North Charles Street, Warrenton and Linkwood Roads, on the north by Cold Spring Lane and on the east by York Road. The neighborhood is adjacent to the neighborhoods of Tuscany-Canterbury, Loyola-Notre Dame, Kernewood, Wilson Park, Pen Lucy, Waverly Oakenshawe, Charles Village, and the universities of Johns Hopkins and Loyola University Maryland.  The neighborhood was added to the National Register of Historic Places in 2001.

History 
The first known resident of the area was General McDonald who fought for the Continental army during the Revolutionary War.  The area was supposedly named after the Battle of Guilford Court House in North Carolina, in which McDonald was wounded.  His son William McDonald inherited his estate in 1850 and built the Guilford Mansion. In 1872 the property was purchased by Baltimore Sun founder, Arunah S. Abell, and would remain in his family for 35 years.  In 1907 the property was purchased by the Guilford Park Company who wanted to develop the area into a sophisticated suburban neighborhood on the edge of expanding Baltimore.  In 1911 they consolidated with the Roland Park Company and together purchased 210 acres in North Baltimore.  Frederick Law Olmsted, Jr. was hired to do the landscape and street design.  He is responsible for giving the neighborhood its distinct curving streets and terrain.   The plan included three parks, “Little Park,” “Stratford Green, and “Sunken Park.  In 1939 a fourth park was created called “Guilford Gateways.”

The company spared no expense on utilities, streets, drains and other infrastructure to create a modern and an attractive living destination for the Baltimore elite.  The houses were designed by some of the most prominent Baltimore architects of the era, included Edward L. Palmer, Bayard Turnbull, John Russell Pope, W. D. Lamdin and Laurence Hall Fowler.  The houses were primarily built in brick or stone and were designed in the popular revival styles of the early 20th century.  In 1913 the new neighborhood opened to much local praise.  After the completed sales of all the houses in Guilford, the Company allocated the Guilford Association to maintain the integrity of the neighborhood.  The Association upholds the covenants of the Deed and Agreement left by the Roland Park Company; these included a racial covenant excluding African American property ownership until such covenants were deemed legally unenforceable.

Residents of the neighborhood included artist Grace Turnbull, whose brother Bayard designed her house and studio, which still stands.

See also
 List of Baltimore neighborhoods

References

External links 
 Guilford Neighborhood Website
 Sherwood Gardens Website
, including photo from 2000, at Maryland Historical Trust, and accompanying map

 
Neighborhoods in Baltimore
Historic districts on the National Register of Historic Places in Baltimore
Colonial Revival architecture in Maryland
Neoclassical architecture in Maryland
Northern Baltimore